Şampaşakaraderbendi is a village in the Pülümür District, Tunceli Province, Turkey. The village is populated by Kurds of the Çarekan tribe and had a population of 36 in 2021.

The hamlets of Aşağışenocak, Düşünceli, Emlik, Geceyatmaz, Göktepe, Gölgecik, Saltaş, Yenikapı and Yukarışenocak are attached to the village.

References 

Kurdish settlements in Tunceli Province
Villages in Pülümür District